Petrophile glauca is a species of flowering plant in the family Proteaceae and is endemic to southwestern Western Australia. It is a shrub with pinnately-divided, flattened, glaucous leaves and more or less spherical heads of hairy yellow to creamy-white flowers.

Description

Taxonomy
Petrophile glauca was first formally described in 1995 by Donald Bruce Foreman in Flora of Australia from material collected by Neville Graeme Marchant in 1979. The specific epithet (glauca) means "having a bluish-grey bloom".

Distribution and habitat
This petrophile grows in a variety of habitats on sandy-gravelly soils between Wagin, Lake King, the Frank Hann National Park, Corrigin and East Mount Barren in the Avon Wheatbelt, Coolgardie, Esperance Plains and Mallee biogeographic regions of southwestern Western Australia.

Conservation status
Petrophile glauca is classified as "not threatened" by the Western Australian Government Department of Parks and Wildlife.

References

glauca
Eudicots of Western Australia
Endemic flora of Western Australia
Plants described in 1995